Angelfire is an Internet service.

Angelfire or Angel Fire may also refer to:

Literature
 Angelfire (novel series), by Courtney Allison Moulton
 Angel Fire (Miscione novel), by Lisa Miscione

Music
 Angelfire (band)
 Angelfire (album), by the group of the same name
 "Angel Fire", a track from Dolores O'Riordan's album Are You Listening?
 "Angelfire", a track from the 2016 Lemon Demon album Spirit Phone

Places
 Angel Fire, New Mexico
 Angel Fire Resort, ski venue